Mikio Chiba (born 1 May 1935) is a Japanese equestrian. He competed at the 1964 Summer Olympics and the 1968 Summer Olympics.

References

External links
 

1935 births
Living people
Japanese male equestrians
Olympic equestrians of Japan
Equestrians at the 1964 Summer Olympics
Equestrians at the 1968 Summer Olympics
Place of birth missing (living people)